Bereket is a city in western Turkmenistan, formerly known as Kazandjik or Gazandjyk. 

Bereket may also refer to:

 Bereket (name)
 Bereket, Burdur
 Bereket, Gülnar, a village in Mersin Province of Turkey
 Bereket, Kurşunlu
 Bereket District, a district of Balkan Province in Turkmenistan
 Bereket, a Kilim motif symbolising fertility

See also
 Barakat (disambiguation)
 Barkat, a surname and given name
 Bereketli (disambiguation)